Bouncin' with Dex is an album led by saxophonist Dexter Gordon recorded in 1975 and released on the Danish SteepleChase label.

Reception

In his review for AllMusic, Ken Dryden said "Dexter Gordon thrived on the attention of European jazz fans while living there during the 1960s and early '70s, while he also had a wealth of opportunities to record for labels on the continent. This 1975 session for Steeplechase, one of a dozen he made as a leader for the label in the mid-'70s, finds him in top form".

Track listing
 "Billie's Bounce" (Charlie Parker) – 8:01
 "Easy Living" (Ralph Rainger, Leo Robin) – 5:28
 "Benji's Bounce" (Dexter Gordon) – 7:06
 "Catalonian Nights" (Gordon) – 8:38
 "Four" (Eddie "Cleanhead" Vinson) – 9:30
 "Easy Living" [Alternate Take] (Rainger, Robin) – 8:02 Bonus track on CD reissue

Personnel
Dexter Gordon – tenor saxophone
Tete Montoliu – piano
Niels-Henning Ørsted Pedersen – bass 
Billy Higgins – drums

References

1976 albums
Dexter Gordon albums
SteepleChase Records albums